Rebais is a commune in the Seine-et-Marne department in the Île-de-France region in north-central France.

Etymology
Rebais has historically been attested in Latin as Rebascis in 635/636 and Rebascum in 1214. The toponym Rebais is of Germanic origin, deriving from a High German dialect, ultimately from Proto-West-Germanic *hross. The Germanic hydronym *-bak(i) entered the French language via High German, and took on two forms: the Germanic form -bach and Romantic -bais.

Demographics
The inhabitants are called  Resbaciens.

See also
 Communes of the Seine-et-Marne department

References

External links

 

Communes of Seine-et-Marne